A dark ride or ghost train is an indoor amusement ride on which passengers aboard guided vehicles travel through specially lit scenes that typically contain animation, sound, music and special effects. Appearing as early as the 19th century, such exhibits include tunnels of love, scary themes and interactive stories.

Terminology

In its most traditional form, the term dark ride refers to ride-through attractions with scenes that use black lights, whereby visible light is prevented from entering the space, and only show elements that fluoresce under ultraviolet radiation are seen by the riders.  The size of each room containing a scene or scenes is thus concealed, and the set designer can use forced perspective, Pepper's ghost and other visual tricks to create the illusion of distance.  Typically, these experiences also use a series of opaque doors between scenes to further control riders' views within a space-constrained building. Prominent examples include Disneyland's Snow White's Scary Adventures, Pinocchio's Daring Journey, Peter Pan's Flight, Mr. Toad's Wild Ride and Alice in Wonderland, which all rely on the use of blacklights in almost every scene.

History
The first dark rides appeared in the late 19th century and were called "scenic railways" and "pleasure railways". A popular type of dark ride commonly referred to as an old mill or tunnel of love used small boats to carry riders through water-filled canals. A Trip to the Moon began operation at the 1901 Pan-American Exposition. Marvin Rempfer and Leon Cassidy of the Pretzel Amusement Ride Company patented the first single-rail electric dark ride in 1928. Historically notable dark rides include Futurama at the 1939 New York World's Fair, and Pirates of the Caribbean and The Haunted Mansion at Disneyland.

Modern attractions in this genre vary widely in technical sophistication. Smaller-scale rides often feature the same sorts of simple animation and sounds used since the genre's early days, while more ambitious projects feature complex animatronics, special effects and ride vehicles utilizing cutting-edge technology.

To improve the effect and give a sense of journey, passages in dark rides frequently change direction. Sudden curves give a sense of disorientation and allow new scenes to surprise the rider. The rides may also feature sudden ascents or descents to further the excitement.

Empirical research
Although ever increasing investments are made in dark rides, empirical research in this area is relatively scarce. Based on a systematic literature review, a team of researchers from the University of Liechtenstein developed a model that illustrates the underlying effect mechanism that attendees of Dark Rides experience.
The model suggests that "Storytelling" in Dark Rides influences an attendee's "emotional attachment" to the ride through the mediator of "Immersion". It is assumed that a person's prior knowledge about the ride's story and a person's cultural background have moderating effects on the relationship between "storytelling" and "immersion".

Variations
Dark rides have a number of variations that are not necessarily mutually exclusive.

Ghost train

In the United Kingdom, the United States, the Republic of Ireland, New Zealand, China and Australia, dark rides with a scary theme are called ghost trains.

The first ride to use the name "Ghost Train" was that of Blackpool Pleasure Beach. The ride was imported in 1930 and originally called The Pretzel (due to the curving shape of its track layout); but as pretzels were little-known in Britain, it was soon renamed after The Ghost Train, a play which ran for a year in London, a film adaptation of which was showing in 1931. It was rebuilt in 1936 and has remained unchanged since. Blackpool Pleasure Beach is also home to Valhalla, the world's largest indoor dark ride, known for its many complex effects.

Prolific designers of dark rides in the UK include Keith Sparks and John Wardley between the 1970s and 1990s. Notable UK dark rides include Phantom Fantasia at Thorpe Park; The 5th Dimension, Terror Tomb, The Gruffalo River Ride Adventure and Professor Burp's Bubbleworks at Chessington World of Adventures; Around The World in 80 Days, The Haunted House, Toyland Tours and Hex – The Legend of the Towers at Alton Towers; and Valhalla at Blackpool Pleasure Beach. (Not a ghost train per se, Derren Brown's Ghost Train at Thorpe Park is a motion simulation and virtual reality attraction.)

In Australia, a dark ride is named The Ghost Train at Luna Park, Melbourne, and a similarly-named ride was destroyed by fire in 1979 at Luna Park Sydney.

The concept is also popular in the United States. One notable ghost train from the country is The Haunted Mansion, first opened in Disneyland in Anaheim, California, on August 9, 1969.

Interactive dark ride

Interactive dark rides feature a component that allows riders to be involved in the attraction's story. The first interactive dark ride ever built is El Paso at the Belgium theme park Bobbejaanland.

The vast majority of interactive dark rides are shooting dark rides, which require riders to aim and shoot at targets throughout the ride using handheld or vehicle-mounted light guns. Successfully shooting a target usually triggers special animation, such as flashing lights or moving the target. The more targets riders hit, the higher their scores at the end of the ride. The use of light guns varies between rides, from killing aliens on Men in Black: Alien Attack at Universal Studios Florida to calling turkeys on Gobbler Getaway at Holiday World & Splashin' Safari. The ride systems of conventional dark rides can be easily converted into shooting dark rides. Such conversions include Duel: The Haunted House Strikes Back! at Alton Towers and Buzz Lightyear's Space Ranger Spin at Disney's Magic Kingdom. The latter uses facilities that previously housed If You Had Wings, Delta Dreamflight, and Take Flight.

Among non-shooting interactive dark rides, Etnaland's award-winning Haunted School is described by Park World magazine as "one of the most idiosyncratic dark rides". It is themed to a school exam, with riders individually answering multiple-choice questions throughout it. Riders are graded on their responses, and each receives a school report at the end of the ride. While technically a coaster, the Gekion Live coaster at Joypolis had elements of a dark ride. It used to have a shooting element, only for it to be refurbished with a dance element (tapping buttons on the restraints) later.

Trackless dark ride

Trackless dark rides utilize automated guided vehicles that do not require guide rails, and thus are able to cross existing paths, reverse, and rotate. Some trackless dark rides, such as the Big Red Car Ride at Dreamworld, rely on a buried wire for navigation. Others, such as Star Wars: Rise of the Resistance at Disney's Hollywood Studios and Disneyland Park, Mystic Manor at Hong Kong Disneyland or Ratatouille: L’Aventure Totalement Toquée de Rémy at Disneyland Paris and Epcot, use Wi-Fi and RFID-based local positioning systems.

Enclosed roller coaster

While some roller coasters may be indoors, simply enclosing a roller coaster does not make it a dark ride.  Dark coasters are roller coasters that feature heavily themed layouts, special effects (such as animated characters, fire, smoke, and sound/lighting effects), and a dark ride portion that abruptly transitions into a roller coaster-style layout with heavily banked turns, sharp turns, steep drops, and helices. Some of them include backward motion, and many have launch mechanisms rather than lifts. Examples include: 

Flight of Fear at Kings Island and Kings Dominion
Blazing Fury at Dollywood
Revenge of the Mummy at many of the Universal Destinations & Experiences (themed to The Mummy film franchise, featuring a launch from the dark ride section into the coaster section)
Seven Dwarfs Mine Train at the Magic Kingdom and Shanghai Disneyland
Scooby-Doo Spooky Coaster at Warner Bros. Movie World (a wild mouse roller coaster with a ghost-train section, vertical lift and backwards drop)
Space Mountain at Disney World, Disneyland Park, Magic Kingdom, Tokyo Disneyland, and Hong Kong Disneyland
Star Wars Hyperspace Mountain at Disneyland Park (Paris)
Verbolten at Busch Gardens Williamsburg (themed to an escape from the haunted Bavarian Black Forest, with a free-fall track section)
Guardians of the Galaxy: Cosmic Rewind at EPCOT

Test Track at Epcot, Journey to the Center of the Earth at Tokyo DisneySea, and Radiator Springs Racers at Disney California Adventure each use a slot car track rather than that of a roller coaster, but they provide a similar pairing of dark ride scenes with a high-speed thrill ride.

Saw – The Ride at Thorpe Park features an enclosed dark section with strobe lighting and special effects, before the car enters the outdoor section of the ride.

Other attractions incorporating dark ride elements
Particularly in Disney-built or -influenced parks, a number of attractions use traditional dark-ride features, such as animatronics and theatrical lighting, but are not "dark rides" in that patrons do not board vehicles. Examples include the walk-through dioramas in Disneyland's Sleeping Beauty Castle, and theater-based Disney attractions like Great Moments with Mr. Lincoln, The Hall of Presidents, The American Adventure and Walt Disney's Enchanted Tiki Room. Walt Disney's Carousel of Progress (and its now-closed Disneyland replacement America Sings) had four auditoriums that rotated audiences around a stationary core with show scenes.

The Tomorrowland Transit Authority PeopleMover in the Magic Kingdom at Walt Disney World and the Disneyland Railroad both include brief dark-ride scenes, but for the most part transport guests outdoors. Expedition Everest at Disney's Animal Kingdom, Matterhorn Bobsleds at Disneyland, Big Thunder Mountain Railroad and Space Mountain at several Disney parks, and Big Grizzly Mountain Runaway Mine Cars at Hong Kong Disneyland likewise include some dark-ride elements, but function primarily as indoor/outdoor roller coasters.

List of dark rides
 Name in italics means that it has been closed; date of closure follows "−".

See also
Black light theatre
Old Mill (ride)

References

External links

Small World Studios: Dark rides that move you
BlueBox Attractions: Dark Ride Designer
Laff In The Dark: Dark Ride and Funhouse information
CAVU Designwerks: Trackless, Interactive, and Traditional Dark Ride Designer
Sally Corporation: Dark Ride Designer
Simworx : Trackless Dark Ride Designer
Garmendale Engineering: Dark Ride Designer
Holovis: Dark Ride Designer
Halloween Productions, Inc. Dark Ride Designer
Alterface : Dark Ride Designer
The Dark Ride Project  : A VR Dark Ride archive